Jarod Joseph (born October 9, 1985) is a Canadian actor who has had roles as Nathan Miller in The 100, Nicholas Fleming in Rogue and Wilson Corvo in Mistresses. NEW* Another Life - Cas Isakovic's dead brother.

Biography
Jarod Joseph grew up in Calgary and was initially interested in sports. Jarod considered taking on basketball or hockey, but abandoned these goals as he felt the need to focus on his grades instead. At the suggestion of a friend, Jarod decided to pursue acting and drove out to Vancouver to look for jobs. He eventually auditioned for a role in Percy Jackson & the Olympians: The Lightning Thief. Though the role was small, it was a major motion picture and it was enough to interest him in continuing a career.

Immediately afterwards, Jarod found himself thrown into television roles over the next several years. He was cast as Detective Nicholas Fleming in Rogue a role that made him nervous as it was his first time as a regular. "My first day on the job was actually a week-and-a-half after most of the cast and crew had already begun working together. There was an established dynamic and rapport that I wasn’t privy to, so I was a little worried about blending in with everyone and doing my thing." While filming Rogue, Jarod began working in recurring roles as Gus / Billy in Once Upon a Time and FBI Agent Tim in Fringe and made guest roles in Arrow, Motive, V, Showcase’s Endgame and AMC’s The Killing.

Jarod was cast as Nathan Miller in The CW TV series The 100 of which he is a major recurring character.

Television

References

External links

1985 births
Living people
Male actors from Calgary
Canadian male television actors
Black Canadian male actors